These are the official results of the Women's Shot Put event at the 1995 IAAF World Championships in Gothenburg, Sweden. There were a total number of 26 participating athletes, with the final held on Saturday August 5, 1995.

Medalists

Schedule
All times are Central European Time (UTC+1)

Abbreviations
All results shown are in metres

Records

Qualification
Qualifying distance: 18.80 metres.

Group A

Group B

Final

See also
 1995 Shot Put Year Ranking
 1996 Women's Olympic Shot Put

References
 Results

s
Shot put at the World Athletics Championships
1995 in women's athletics